Beykan Şimşek (born 1 January 1995) is a Turkish footballer who plays for Kocaelispor.

Career
Beykan made his debut with Fenerbahçe in the Turkish Cup on 23 January 2013 against Bursaspor. He replaced Miroslav Stoch after 73 minutes. He scored the third goal in the 86th minute in a 3-0 victory. One month later he played his second game against 1461 Trabzon, again in the Turkish Cup. He replaced Caner Erkin after 62 minutes. On 7 April 2013, he made his league debut against Orduspor. He replaced striker Pierre Webó after 85 minutes.

Before the 2015-2016 season, he reached an agreement with Sivasspor for a loan deal that will last for 3 years but in 2017 he moved to Altinordu on loan for end of 2016/17 season.

References

External links

1995 births
People from Aydın
Living people
Turkish footballers
Turkey youth international footballers
Turkey B international footballers
Association football forwards
Fenerbahçe S.K. footballers
Kardemir Karabükspor footballers
Adana Demirspor footballers
Sivasspor footballers
Altınordu F.K. players
Sakaryaspor footballers
Ankaraspor footballers
Göztepe S.K. footballers
Bandırmaspor footballers
Kocaelispor footballers
Süper Lig players
TFF First League players
TFF Second League players